Dominika Müllnerová (born 26 March 1992) is a Czech handball player for DHK Banik Most and the Czech national team.

She represented the Czech Republic at the 2013 World Women's Handball Championship in Serbia.

References

External links

Czech female handball players
1992 births
Living people
Sportspeople from Ústí nad Labem